The 1976–77 season was Newport County's 15th consecutive season in the Football League Fourth Division and their 49th season overall in the Football League. The season became known as the "Great Escape" as County were entrenched in the re-election places until the last game of the season and would almost certainly have been voted out of the league had they finished there.

Season review

Results summary

Results by round

Fixtures and results

Fourth Division

FA Cup

Football League Cup

Welsh Cup

League table

P = Matches played; W = Matches won; D = Matches drawn; L = Matches lost; F = Goals for; A = Goals against; GD = Goal difference; Pts = Points

References

External links
 Newport County 1976-1977 : Results
 Newport County football club match record: 1977
 Welsh Cup 1976/77

1976-77
English football clubs 1976–77 season
1976–77 in Welsh football